Manitook Mountain, also called Manituck Mountain, is a  long traprock mountain ridge located between the Berkshires and the Connecticut River Valley in north-central Connecticut.  It is an outlying ridge belonging to the narrow, linear Metacomet Ridge that extends from Long Island Sound near New Haven, Connecticut, north through the Connecticut River Valley of Massachusetts to the Vermont border. Manitook Mountain is known for its  ledges and microclimate ecosystems. The mountain has no official trail.

Geography
Located entirely within Granby, Connecticut, its northern summit abuts the Connecticut/ Massachusetts border near Southwick, Massachusetts. The mountain is particularly prominent as viewed from the Congamond Lakes to the north. 

The north side of the mountain drains into the Congamond Lakes then into Great Brook, thence to the Westfield River, the Connecticut River, and Long Island Sound. The remainder of the mountain is of the Salmon Brook watershed, which drains into the Farmington River, thence into the Connecticut River.

Geology and ecology
Manitook Mountain, like much of the Metacomet Ridge, is composed of basalt, also called traprock, a volcanic rock. The mountain formed near the end of the Triassic Period with the rifting apart of the North American continent from Africa and Eurasia. Lava welled up from the rift and solidified into sheets of strata hundreds of feet thick. Subsequent faulting and earthquake activity tilted the strata, creating the cliffs and ridgeline of Manitook Mountain. Hot, dry upper slopes, cool, moist ravines, and mineral-rich ledges of basalt talus produce a combination of microclimate ecosystems on the mountain that support plant and animal species uncommon in greater Connecticut. Manitook Mountain is also an important raptor migration path. (See Metacomet Ridge for more information on the geology and ecosystem of Manitook Mountain).

Conservation and recreation
Expanding suburban sprawl presents the greatest threats to the unique ecosystem and landscape of Manitook Mountain. As of 2007, much of the mountain was still wooded and undeveloped. The Granby Land Trust manages several properties on and near the mountain.

References
 Farnsworth, Elizabeth J. "Metacomet-Mattabesett Trail Natural Resource Assessment."  2004. PDF wefile cited November 1, 2007. 
 Raymo, Chet and Maureen E. Written in Stone: A Geologic History of the Northeastern United States. Globe Pequot, Chester, Connecticut, 1989.
 DeLorme Topo 6.0 (2006). Mapping software. DeLorme: Yarmouth, Maine

External links
 Granby Land Trust

Landforms of Hartford County, Connecticut
Metacomet Ridge, Connecticut
Mountains of Connecticut
Granby, Connecticut